Baş Belası is a Turkish television drama in action and comedy genre . It is produced by ARC film, directed by Murat Onbul and screenplayed by several screenwriters like Gulsec Karagoz, Zafer Ozer Cetinel, Ahmet Orcun Oksar, and Ramzan Demirli. The series in which Irem Helvacioglu and Seckin Ozdemir starred first aired on TV on June 20, 2021, and ended on September 10, 2021, with 13th episode.''

Plot 
It is about the experiences of İpek Gümüşçü, a woman who devoted herself to her family, when she started working as a psychologist in the police department as a result of the events that shook her life deeply. Ipek's detective interest, which has been her passion since childhood, will often bring her against the head of the homicide bureau, Şahin Kara. 'Baş Belası' (The troublemaker) is the fun stories of these two characters, which are diametrically opposed to each other, decorated with detective adventures.

Cast 

 Irem Helvacioglu – Ipek Gumuscu
 Seckin Ozdemir – Sahin Kara
 Dilara Aksuyek – Nasli Tuzun
 Bulent Duzgunoglu – Mehmet Yagci
 Nese Baykent – Perihan Aydogan
 Taner Rumeli – Yener Yilmaz
 Yilmaz Kunt – Doruk Akkaya
 Buce Buse Kahraman – Nermin Kuscu
 Mert Yavuzcan – Birol Tuzun
 Ergul Miray Sahin – Betul Gulmez
 Ozgur Cem Tugluk – Umut Ertek
 Eyup Mert Ilkis – Gorkem Gumuscu

General View

Episodes

References 

Turkish drama television series